Holladay is an unincorporated community in Benton and Decatur counties in the U.S. state of Tennessee. Another portion of the community is located at the intersection of I-40 and US 641/SR 69. Holladay has a post office with ZIP code 38341, which opened on February 23, 1887.

Demographics

References

Unincorporated communities in Benton County, Tennessee
Unincorporated communities in Tennessee
Unincorporated communities in Decatur County, Tennessee